Napoleon Abdulai is a Ghanaian diplomat and a member of the New Patriotic Party of Ghana. He is currently Ghana's ambassador to Cuba.

Ambassadorial appointment 
In July 2017, President Nana Akuffo-Addo named Napoleon Abdulai as Ghana's ambassador to Cuba. He was among 22 other Ghanaians who were named to head diplomatic Ghanaian mission in the world.

References

Year of birth missing (living people)
Living people
Ambassadors of Ghana to Cuba
New Patriotic Party politicians